Joscelyne is a surname. Notable people with the surname include:

Albert Joscelyne (1866–1945), English Anglican bishop
Barbara Joscelyne (born 1959), British Paralympic athlete
Blair Joscelyne (born 1978), Australian composer, musician, producer, and film maker

See also
 Jocelyn